The Kansas Wesleyan Coyotes are the athletic teams that represent Kansas Wesleyan University, located in Salina, Kansas, in intercollegiate athletics as a member of the National Association of Intercollegiate Athletics (NAIA), primarily competing in the Kansas Collegiate Athletic Conference (KCAC) since the 1902–03 academic year.

Varsity teams
Kansas Wesleyan competes in 25 intercollegiate varsity sports: Men's sports include baseball, basketball, bowling, cross country, football, golf, soccer, tennis, track & field (indoor and outdoor) and volleyball; while women's sports include basketball, bowling, cross country, flag football, golf, soccer, softball, tennis, track & field (indoor and outdoor) and volleyball; and co-ed sports include competitive cheer, competitive dance and eSports.

Football

The Coyotes football program made its first appearance in 1893 with a record of four wins and one loss.  They would not field a team again until 1899 when the school played one game against Kansas State Agriculture College (now known as Kansas State University) and lost by a score of 17–5.  The program continued every year until 1904 when the program was suspended for one year.  In all, the school did not field a team during the following years: 1894–1898, 1904, 1910–1913, 1918, and 1943–1945.  As of completion of the 2009 season, the program has an all-time record of 379 wins, 377 losses, and 38 ties.

Bowl games
Kansas Wesleyan played in American Family Insurance Charity Bowl on December 12, 2000 against rival Bethany.  The team lost by a score of 20–3.

References

External links 
 

 
Sports in Salina, Kansas